Soy Yo is the fifth studio album by singer-songwriter Kany García. The album was released on May 18, 2018. The album debuted at number four on Billboard Latin Album charts. Soy Yo is Garcia's fifth top 10 effort, and marks just the second album by a woman to debut in the top five on Top Latin Albums in 2018. The album was included in Billboard magazine's "The 50 Best Albums of 2018 (So Far)". “Soy Yo” was included on Billboard's ”The 50 Best Latin Albums of the Decade”.

Track listing

Critical reception
The album debuted at number four on Billboard Latin Albums, number two on Billboard Latin Pop and number one in Puerto Rico Album charts with sales of 3,000 units (nearly all in album sales). The album was included in Billboards "The 50 Best Albums of 2018 (So Far)" list.

According to Billboard:

Accolades

Charts

Weekly charts

Year-end charts

Certifications

Awards and nominations

References

2018 albums
Kany García albums
Sony Music Latin albums